Flórián Albert (1941–2011) was a Hungarian footballer.

Flórián Albert may also refer to:
 Flórián Albert Jr. (born 1967), Hungarian footballer, son of Flórián Albert
 Stadion Albert Flórián, former Hungarian football stadium